Brian Hatton (12 August 1887 – 23 April 1916) was a British artist. He was born in Broomy Hill, Herefordshire, and killed in action during the First World War. His works showed considerable promise and include local landscapes, family portraits, figure studies and book illustrations. A major exhibition of his work was displayed at the Hereford Museum and Art Gallery between  November 2007 and January 2008.

References

External links

 the-athenaeum.org, Brian Hatton
 Artuk.org Brian Hatton

1887 births
1916 deaths
Military personnel from Herefordshire
People from Hereford
English male painters
20th-century English painters
Académie Julian alumni
English illustrators
20th-century male artists
British Army personnel of World War I
Worcestershire Yeomanry officers
British military personnel killed in World War I